Marjorie Morgan (1915 – July 10, 2007) was a Canadian writer and author.

Marie Ann
Her most noted work, the film Marie-Anne, was co-written with George Salverson and directed by Martin Walters. It starred Andrée Pelletier, John Juliani, Tantoo Cardinal and Gordon Tootoosis.

Death
Morgan died of Alzheimer's disease on July 10, 2007, aged 92.

References

External links 

Canadian women screenwriters
Deaths from Alzheimer's disease
Neurological disease deaths in Canada
1915 births
2007 deaths
Place of birth missing
Place of death missing
20th-century Canadian women writers
Writers from Alberta
20th-century Canadian screenwriters